KIZ is a German new-wave band.

Kiz or KIZ may also refer to:
 Kiz, Utah, ghost town in the United States
 KIZ (gene), a gene that in humans encodes the Kizuna centrosomal protein
 K.I.Z, a German hip-hop group
 Kiz Bridge, a historical bridge near the Mianeh in East Azerbaijan